Jadwiga Maria Rutkowska (née Abisiak, later Dobrowolska) (2 February 1934 – 19 June 2004) was a former Polish volleyball player, a member of Poland women's national volleyball team in 1953–1964, a bronze medalist of the Olympic Games Tokyo 1964, a bronze medalist of the European Championship 1955), ten-time Polish Champion.

External links
 
 
 
 

1934 births
2004 deaths
Olympic volleyball players of Poland
Volleyball players at the 1964 Summer Olympics
Olympic bronze medalists for Poland
Polish women's volleyball players
Olympic medalists in volleyball
People from Żyrardów County
Sportspeople from Masovian Voivodeship
Medalists at the 1964 Summer Olympics